The first season of the American competitive reality television series MasterChef Junior premiered on Fox on September 27, 2013 and concluded on November 8, 2013.

The winner was Alexander Weiss, a 13-year-old from New York City, New York, with Dara Yu from Los Angeles, California being the runner-up.

Top 12

Elimination table

 (WINNER) This cook won the competition.
 (RUNNER-UP) This cook finished in second place.
 (WIN) The cook won an individual challenge (Mystery Box Challenge or Elimination Test).
 (WIN) The cook was on the winning team in the Team Challenge and directly advanced to the next round.
 (HIGH) The cook was one of the top entries in an individual challenge but did not win.
 (IN) The cook was not selected as a top or bottom entry in an individual challenge.
 (IN) The cook was not selected as a top or bottom entry in a Team Challenge.
 (IMM) The cook did not have to compete in that round of competition and was safe from elimination.
 (LOW) The cook was one of the bottom entries in an individual challenge, and advanced.
 (LOW) The cook was one of the bottom entries in a Team Challenge,  advanced.
 (ELIM) The cook was eliminated.

Episodes

References

2013 American television seasons
Season 1